Gong Weijie (born 2 June 1986) is a Chinese badminton player from Jingzhou, Hubei. Gong joined the Xiamen team in 1997, and was selected to join the national team in 2002. In the junior event, he won the silver medal in the boys' singles event at the 2004 Asian and World Junior Championships. Gong, who was educated at the China University of Geosciences, claimed the men' singles title at the 2006 World University Championships. He was also part of the national team that won the silver medal at the 2007 Summer Universiade, and became a finalist at the 2009 German Open. After retiring from the tournament, Gong found the Wei Jie Culture Communication company and Gong Weijie badminton club.

Achievements

World Junior Championships 
Boys' singles

Asian Junior Championships 
Boys' singles

BWF Grand Prix 
The BWF Grand Prix has two levels, the Grand Prix and Grand Prix Gold. It is a series of badminton tournaments sanctioned by the Badminton World Federation (BWF) since 2007.

Men's singles

 BWF Grand Prix Gold tournament
 BWF Grand Prix tournament

References

External links
 
 

1986 births
Living people
Badminton players from Hubei
Chinese male badminton players
China University of Geosciences alumni
Universiade medalists in badminton
Universiade silver medalists for China
Medalists at the 2007 Summer Universiade